Joseph Thauvette (8 July 1876 – 24 November 1955) was a Liberal party member of the House of Commons of Canada. He was born in Les Cèdres, Quebec, and became a physician by career.

Thauvette attended Bourget College in Rigaud where he received a Bachelor of Science degree.

Thauvette served as mayor of Vaudreuil, Quebec.

He was first elected to Parliament at the Vaudreuil—Soulanges riding in the 1930 general election and re-elected there in 1935 and 1940. After completing his term in the 19th Canadian Parliament, Thauvette did not seek re-election in 1945.

References

External links
 

1876 births
1955 deaths
Physicians from Quebec
Liberal Party of Canada MPs
Mayors of places in Quebec
Members of the House of Commons of Canada from Quebec